"Back in My Younger Days" is a song written by Danny Flowers, and recorded by American country music artist Don Williams.  It was released in September 1990 as the first single from Williams' album True Love.  The song reached number 2 on the Billboard Hot Country Singles & Tracks chart in November 1990 and number 1 on the RPM Country Tracks chart in Canada.

Chart performance

Year-end charts

References

1990 songs
1990 singles
Don Williams songs
Songs written by Danny Flowers
Song recordings produced by Garth Fundis
RCA Records singles